Robert Keith Orton Jr. (born November 10, 1950), better known by the ring name "Cowboy" Bob Orton, is an American semi-retired professional wrestler. He is the son of professional wrestler Bob Orton Sr., the brother of professional wrestler Barry Orton, and the father of professional wrestler Randy Orton. He is best known for his time in the WWF (World Wrestling Federation, now WWE). He has also wrestled for several promotions in the United States, Japan, and other countries.

Early life
Bob Orton Jr. was born in Kansas City, Missouri, and is the son of professional wrestler Bob Orton Sr.

Professional wrestling career

Championship Wrestling from Florida (1972–1980)
Orton trained with Hiro Matsuda, after dropping out of college, and at the age of 22, Orton made his debut in the promotion Championship Wrestling from Florida in 1972 with the ring name of Young Mr. Wrestling wrestling in instances with his father Bob Orton Sr. They won the tag team title from the promotion. Orton was one of the first wrestlers to use the Superplex as his finishing maneuver. Orton, in his early days in wrestling, used a gimmick of a masked wrestler known as The Invader. He often used this gimmick, until 1976.

American Wrestling Association (1976, 1978, 1988)
Orton spent time in Verne Gagne's American Wrestling Association in 1976 and 1978, a large portion of it under the tutelage of AWA MVP Manager Bobby Heenan. Orton feuded with Greg Gagne among others. Gagne-Orton was a featured match on the AWA undercard for the Muhammad Ali-Antonio Inoki mixed martial arts match.

Orton had a brief stint back in the AWA in early 1988 following his November 1987 dismissal from the WWF, during which he renewed his alliance with Adrian Adonis from the WWF.

National Wrestling Alliance (1980–1982)
Following experiencing success in the Florida, Central States, and Mid-South regions, Orton competed in the National Wrestling Alliance in 1980-1981 using a cowboy's gimmick. While he competed in the NWA, he won several matches and earned a reputation as a hard worker and legit tough wrestler. In 1982, he left the NWA to sign a contract with the World Wrestling Federation.

World Wrestling Federation (1982)
In 1982, Orton competed in the World Wrestling Federation. He challenged Bob Backlund for the WWF Heavyweight Championship in Philadelphia, winning by count-out (the title cannot change of hands by disqualification or count-out). 
They had a lumberjack match a month later again in Philadelphia, but Orton was again unsuccessful. 
Their matches ran in some of the largest cities on the WWF circuit.

Return to NWA (1982-1984)
He returned to the NWA again in 1982 and captured the tag team title with Don Kernodle. The duo held the title for two months before succumbing to Wahoo McDaniel and Mark Youngblood.

Together with Dick Slater, he had a feud with Ric Flair. Orton and Slater interfered in Flair's return match against NWA World Champion Harley Race, who had beaten Flair for the title. They attacked Flair with an aided piledriver, which caused Flair a severe injury in the neck and put Flair out of wrestling for several months, thus collecting a bounty placed on Flair's head by Race, who was reluctant to wrestle Flair in return matches for the title. In the run-up to this incident, Orton had been portrayed as a babyface and a longtime friend of Flair - his participation in the attack was thus portrayed as the betrayal of that friendship. Flair would eventually return in late 1983, attacking both Orton and Slater with a baseball bat (before going on to win back the title from Race at Starrcade '83).

Return to WWF (1984–1987, 1989, 1990)
Orton re-joined the WWF in March 1984 for what would be the most famous run of his career. He was often addressed as "Ace" Orton by Roddy Piper, and was Piper's bodyguard. His other gimmick, wearing a cast during his matches, stemmed from legitimately having his left forearm broken in a match with Jimmy Snuka at the 1985 event The War to Settle the Score in Madison Square Garden. Although the injury healed in real life, the "cast" gimmick involved Orton—on "doctor's orders"—continuing to wear the cast, claiming the injury had not healed; Orton instead would use the cast to his advantage, striking his opponents behind the referee's back. He won several matches, with the cast and without the cast.

In 1984, Orton was the #1 contender to the WWF Intercontinental Championship, eventually wrestling then-current champion Tito Santana. Orton was successful in winning untelevised matches and events against Santana, but Orton mostly won by either count-out or disqualification. Orton would also be successful in defeating Santana in non-title bouts, but Santana ultimately remained as the champ, and Santana eventually got the upper hand in the feud.

Orton would also engage in a bitter feud with Jimmy Snuka through 1985 and 1986. Orton, just like with Santana, managed to achieve victories over Snuka but mainly in untelevised shows. Just like his feud with Santana, Snuka would get the upper hand in the feud.

Orton was involved in the main event of the first WrestleMania at Madison Square Garden in 1985, being in the corner of Piper and 'Mr. Wonderful' Paul Orndorff in their match against Hulk Hogan and Mr. T. Orton accidentally cost his team the match after an attempted cheat backfired, resulting in him hitting Orndorff with the cast. Orton also competed in the main event against WWF Champion Hulk Hogan on Saturday Night's Main Event I on NBC broadcast May 11, 1985, which he lost by disqualification due to the interference of Piper. Orton took part in the 1985 King of the Ring tournament on July 8 he fought Paul Orndorff to a double disqualification

Orton remained with Piper for the remainder of 1985, feuding with Orndorff and a variety of partners, such as Hogan, André the Giant, and Bruno Sammartino. In early 1986, Orndorff began wearing a cast as a neutralizer, and the WWF ordered both men to remove their casts. Also, in late 1985 and early 1986, Orton challenged Hogan for the WWF Heavyweight Championship; like his matches four years earlier against Backlund, Orton was not successful. On June 30, at a house show held on Bloomington, Minnesota, Orton and Piper surprisingly scored an upset victory over Orndorff and Hogan, albeit by DQ; this event also would be the first time Orton got a victory over Hogan as previous matches between them typically saw Hogan winning.

Orton was dubbed "Boxing" Bob and "Battling" Bob in early 1986 after the cast came off and fought Mr. T at Saturday Night's Main Event V, which served as a setup for the Piper-Mr. T match at WrestleMania 2. Prior to WrestleMania 2, "Boxing" Bob Orton defeated Jose Luis Rivera in a boxing match. At WrestleMania 2, Orton was introduced as "Ace in Comedy and Funnyman" by guest ring announcer Joan Rivers, who misread the card.

Piper and Orton went their separate ways after WrestleMania, with Piper taking a hiatus and Orton in the meantime becoming the bodyguard for Piper's talk-segment successor "Adorable" Adrian Adonis; Adonis had Orton wear a pink cowboy hat. When Piper returned later in 1986 to reclaim his talk show segment (turning face in the process), Orton betrayed his long-time friend, sparking a violent feud between Piper and Orton and his new partners, which typically saw Piper winning. During this time, Orton formed a tag team with The Magnificent Muraco, with the duo managed by Mr. Fuji, and sometimes Jimmy Hart. During their first years as a team, the team of Muraco and Orton was given a fairly decent push, and both were able to easily defeat preliminary wrestlers when not teaming. They appeared at the opening match at WrestleMania III, losing to the Can-Am Connection (Rick Martel and Tom Zenk).

The team of Muraco and Orton also got into a series of matches with The Killer Bees (a team composed of B. Brian Blair and Jumpin' Jim Brunzell). Both teams exchanged victories at televised events, but ultimately the Bees got the upper hand at untelevised events. Referee Danny Davis would usually disqualify the Bees as a part of his heel gimmick. They (along Tiger Chung Lee) were notable for being the first team to lose to The Young Stallions (a team composed by Jim Powers and Paul Roma) alongside Tito Santana.

By 1987, the team of Muraco and Orton was clearly stepping down the card. While they were still able to defeat preliminary teams, Orton and Muraco would usually find themselves on the losing end to upper-card teams. Orton and Muraco then eventually started arguing during their matches, which also caused them to lose credibility as a team. This finally led to a match on WWF Superstars of Wrestling where Orton caused him and Muraco to lose a match when Orton kept Muraco from performing a Superplex, which was Orton's finishing move. Orton felt offended that Muraco was trying to steal his hold. This led to a brawl between both wrestlers that took place inside and outside the ring. On September 7, 1987, Orton and Muraco finally faced off at a WWF house show. This match ended in a double disqualification. Orton and Muraco faced off during the late months of 1987. By this point, the team was essentially disbanded, with the now turned face "The Rock" Magnificent Muraco getting the upper hand in the feud. During Orton's feud with Muraco, Mr. Fuji would return to manage Orton (Muraco dumped Mr. Fuji as his manager following his face turn). Orton's last televised match and victory as a whole in the WWF came on October 10, 1987, in a heated victory against preliminary wrestler Siva Afi. Orton's last match with the WWF came on November 7, 1987, where Orton fought preliminary wrestler Sam Houston to a draw in his home state of Missouri. Orton was fired after this for getting arrested for causing a disturbance at a Calgary airport.

In 1989, Orton attempted to make a comeback to the WWF, losing to Ted DiBiase in a WWF house show at Springfield, MI on October 11. However, no contract was ever offered to him.

By 1990, Orton was wrestling for the Arena Wrestling Alliance promotion. As the AWA had an agreement with the WWF to exchange talent, Orton made appearances for the WWF, at three house show-matches. All took place in New Zealand. Orton was also scheduled to make an appearance for a WWF show in Madison Square Garden in January 1990 against Bret Hart, but that was cancelled. Then Orton would depart from the company for 15 years before returning in 2005.

New Japan Pro-Wrestling (1988–1989)

After leaving the WWF, Orton took a short hiatus from wrestling, inactive until 1988, when Orton travelled to Japan. During this time, he wrestled for New Japan Pro-Wrestling, working with his brother Barry O, and they formed the team of the Gaspar Brothers, two hockey-masked pirates, with Bob using the ring name of Billy Gaspar while Barry called himself Barry Gaspar. They won several matches together, beating the teams of Nobuhiko Takada and Antonio Inoki, Kuniaki Kobayashi and Riki Choshu, Osamu Kido and Yoshiaki Fujiwara, Hiro Saito and Super Strong Machine and many others. After the team of the Gaspar Brothers ended, Orton briefly teamed with Dick Murdoch and Scott Hall in NJPW for the Japan Cup Elimination League. After wrestling a few more matches in 1989 with a low number of victories, Orton left New Japan.

World Championship Wrestling (1989)
On March 30, 1989, Orton made his debut with then National Wrestling Alliance member, World Championship Wrestling. Wrestling at a WCW Saturday Night taping in Atlanta, Georgia and managed by Gary Hart, Orton defeated Shane Douglas. On the April 1 episode of Saturday Night, it was announced that Orton would be facing his former partner Dick Murdoch at the upcoming Clash of Champions VI. The following day at the Clash, Orton defeated Murdoch after Gary Hart interfered. He then went on a house show tour facing mostly preliminary opposition. On April 14 in Milwaukee, Wisconsin Orton suffered his first defeat, falling to Mike Justice. Murdoch challenged Orton to a bullrope match after he had interfered in one of Orton's matches, in which Orton defeated Trent Knight. He lost to Murdoch at the 1989 Wrestlewar in the bullrope match. Shortly after the match, Orton's manager "Playboy" Gary Hart started brawling with Murdoch, and then Orton attacked Murdoch with the cowbell of the bullrope, and threw him out of the ring, choking him, and attacking the referees that were trying to stop him in the process. After his release, Orton made a one-time appearance at a WCW house show in Kiel, Missouri, defeating Dutch Mantell.

Second return to WWE (2005–2006)
On February 3, 2005, Bob Orton was announced as a 2005 inductee into the WWE Hall of Fame. In the weeks preceding WrestleMania 21, Orton became entangled in his son Randy's feud with The Undertaker. During an episode of SmackDown!, Orton begged The Undertaker to show mercy on his son in order to distract The Undertaker long enough for his son to sneak into the ring and hit the RKO. At WrestleMania, he (unsuccessfully) interfered in the match between Orton and The Undertaker, striking The Undertaker with his cast. On August 21, 2005, at SummerSlam, Orton interfered in a rematch between Randy and The Undertaker, this time enabling his son to defeat The Undertaker. Orton then began accompanying Randy to ringside during his matches, and teamed with his son at No Mercy on October 9, 2005, defeating The Undertaker in a handicap casket match. The Ortons teamed together once again on the October 28, 2005 episode of SmackDown!, joining forces with Ken Kennedy to face Roddy Piper, Batista, and Eddie Guerrero in a six-man tag team match. The match ended in defeat for the Ortons when Orton succumbed to Piper's sleeper hold. On the December 16, 2005 episode of SmackDown!, Orton disguised himself as one of the Undertaker's druids and carried The Undertaker's signature urn to ringside as The Undertaker came to the ring to confront Randy. Orton remained at ringside after the other druids had left, distracting The Undertaker and enabling Randy to attack him. Orton then handed Randy the urn, which Randy used to knock The Undertaker unconscious. At Armageddon, Orton (still holding the urn) accompanied Randy to ringside for his Hell in a Cell match with The Undertaker. He interfered in the match several times, but was ultimately unable to prevent The Undertaker from delivering a Tombstone Piledriver to both Ortons and then covering Randy for the win. On February 13, 2006, Orton was released from WWE.

Independent circuit (1990–present)
In 1990 he appeared in the Five Star Wrestling Federation in Baton Rouge which was headed by Grizzly Smith, and that same year, Orton appeared in International World Class Championship Wrestling. In 1991 he wrestled for Herb Abrams' Universal Wrestling Federation at their lone pay-per-view Beach Brawl, as well as their live wrestling special Blackjack Brawl. In the UWF, Orton was awarded the UWF Intercontinental Heavyweight Championship as well as winning the UWF Southern States Championship from former rival and tag-team partner Ron Garvin. Orton lost the UWF Southern States Championship to Paul Orndorff, although, Orton was awarded the title back in 1994 when Orndorff left the promotion, vacating the title in the process.

In 1994, Orton made a few appearances for Jim Cornette's Smoky Mountain Wrestling. That same year, Orton wrestled for the American Wrestling Federation, and during his time in the AWF, he was managed by Oliver Humperdink. Orton challenged Tito Santana for the AWF Championship, with AWF commissioner Jim Brunzell as the special referee for the match, but Orton lost the match. During 1995 and 1996 he feuded with Santana. During Orton's time in the AWF, Orton received a big push, and he was the number one contender for Santana's AWF Championship in 1996. He won the AWF Championship in his second attempt, before losing the championship to Santana that same night in the last round. He had a brief feud in 1997 against "Sexy" Ace Steele in MVWA in St. Louis. In 1999, he appeared at the Heroes of Wrestling PPV, in which Orton was defeated by former rival Jimmy Snuka, after an interference of Snuka's manager Lou Albano. He retired from full-time active competition in that same year, but has continued to wrestle on a semi-regular basis.

Orton returned to the ring at Millennium Wrestling Federation Soul Survivor II in 2004, teaming with Todd Hanson and Beau Douglas to defeat "The Ugandan Giant" Kamala, Gino Marktino, and Ox Baker's Executioner.

On December 5, 2005, Orton participated in a match against wrestler Dingo. Orton was defeated.

On October 17, 2009, Orton (accompanied by his youngest son Nathan) performed at Independent Hardcore Wrestling against "Bloody" Harker Dirge, in a match for the Pro Wrestling Entertainment championship, losing by disqualification after Nathan attacked Dirge. This occasion marked Nathan Orton's first appearance in a professional wrestling event. In 2009, Orton appeared at the IWC "Night of Legends" event, performing against former rival Jimmy Snuka. Orton was defeated. In 2009, Orton faced Vance Desmond in the 2009 Winter Wrestlefest event, promoted by Canadian Promotion All Star Wrestling (ASW) Orton lost to Desmond.

In 2010, Orton faced "Bullet" Bob Armstrong for the Juggalo Championship Wrestling "Wrestling Legend & Loonies 2010" event. Orton was defeated by Armstrong despite Orton dominating him most of the match. On November 19, 2011, Orton appeared in the main event of a Holy Havoc Championship Wrestling card in Springfield, Illinois, teaming with HHCW Heavyweight Champion Pretty Boy Floyd and Mr. Allstar Rex Gill to defeat The Irish Revolution (Mickey Thomas and Seamus Farnam) and Beast. On August 25, 2012, Orton appeared at a Wrestling Past Present Future (WPPF) event in East Moline, IL. The match was billed as "Cowboy versus Cowboy" due to Orton's opponent, "Cowboy" Troy Hansen also using the moniker "Cowboy". Orton won by pinfall.

On February 9, 2013, Orton appeared at a Traditional Championship Wrestling (TCW) event in Jonesboro, Ark., where he managed and mentored International Heavyweight Champion "Mr. Saturday Night" Michael Barry in a feud with his cousin "All That" Alan Steel. He also participated in a non-televised dark match at the event when he turned on Barry and aligned himself with "The Empire" consisting of Matt Riviera and "Golden Boy" Greg Anthony. This team took on Michael Barry, Barrett Brown and John Saxon. The Empire along with Orton lost to Barry, Brown, and Saxon. On June 13, 2013, Orton faced Barrett Brown in a losing effort.

On August 16, 2013, Orton and George South faced Tim Horner and Tom Prichard at the Brad Armstrong Memorial event. Orton and South lost to Horner and Prichard. On November 16, 2013, Orton teamed up with former rival Harker Dirge to take on the team of Attitude, Inc., Guy Smith and Spencer Powers, in tag team action at the monthly Pro Wrestling Glory show in Maroa, Illinois. Orton and Dirge won the match. On October 25, 2014, Orton wrestled rival "Spotlight" Spencer Powers for the Pinfall Wrestling Association P.W.A. Heavyweight title at the Jaycee's Center in Springfield, Illinois. Orton was defeated.

On March 21, 2015, Orton participated in a 6-man tag team match teaming with Ricky Cruz and Red River Jack with Nikolai Volkoff as their manager to take on Chris Hargas, Bull Bronson and Attila Khan. Orton's team came victorious. In April 2015, Orton participated in a 2-on-1 handicap match taking on "Iron Man" Ken Kasa & Travis Cook for the St. Louis Wrestling promotion. Orton defeated Kasa and Cook after applying an RKO to Kasa. On May 30, 2015, Orton was the Special Guest of Pinfall Wrestling Association in Springfield, Illinois at their biggest show of the year, The Grand Wrestling Spectacle V. Orton defeated Bradley Stephens III (who was looking for a "Legend" to challenge).

As of 2022, Orton makes occasional appearances at age 72.

Third return to WWE (2010, 2012, 2017)
Orton made an appearance on the November 15, 2010 episode of WWE Raw as the show went old school, with appearances from past WWE wrestlers, announcers and other on-air personalities. He also appeared on the April 10, 2012 episode of WWE SmackDown and was attacked by Kane (offscreen) who had been feuding with his son Randy at the time. Orton appeared once again on June 18, 2017 at the Money in the Bank Pay-per-view, situated in the front row of the crowd along with fellow Hall of Famers Ric Flair and Sgt. Slaughter. During the match between his son Randy and Jinder Mahal he would be assaulted by the Singh brothers as they were ejected from ringside, this prompted Randy to attack the Singh brothers. However this distraction proved enough for Jinder to hit Randy with the Khallas for the victory.

Personal life
Orton is married to Elaine Orton, a nurse at Christian Hospital NE in Missouri, and they have two sons, Randy (also a professional wrestler), Nathan (a stand-up comedian), and a daughter, Becky. His first grandchild was born on July 12, 2008, when son Randy and his now ex-wife Samantha had their first child, a daughter, Alanna.

On an episode of WWE Confidential, he admitted that his forearm injury in the 1985 match with Jimmy Snuka was not a work and did not heal when he wore the cast. It wouldn't heal fully until he left the WWF in 1987.

Around 1986, Orton was involved in an incident in Fresno, California, where the Fresno Police Department were called for an incident involving Orton and Roddy Piper in a hotel. Orton would end up naked and drunk on the roof of the hotel and would be shot three times with police tasers, according to Orton himself.

Health
As a teenager, Orton was diagnosed with hepatitis C, but apparently showed no apparent symptoms and would eventually no longer recall having the disease. Over 30 years later, in the midst of his feud with his son Randy against The Undertaker, Orton was retested and it was confirmed that he still carried the disease. The Undertaker was furious that he was uninformed of Orton's illness and learned that former Head of Talent Relations John Laurinaitis (who knew of Orton's disease) allowed him to blade, as at one point in the feud (during a Hell in a Cell match at Armageddon 2005), Orton spilled blood directly onto him, which could have caused him to contract the disease. This was the main reason Orton was let go by WWE in February 2006.

Championships and accomplishments
 American Wrestling Federation
 AWF Heavyweight Championship (1 time)
 Cauliflower Alley Club
 Family Award (2005) – with Barry Orton and Bob Orton
 Central States Wrestling Alliance
 CSWA Heavyweight Championship (1 time)
 Championship Wrestling from Florida
 NWA Florida Heavyweight Championship (1 time)
 NWA Florida Tag Team Championship (3 times) - with Bob Orton (1) and Bob Roop (2)
 International Championship Wrestling
 ICW Southeastern Heavyweight Championship (1 time)
 ICW Southeastern Tag Team Championship (3 times) - with Barry Orton (1), Bob Roop (1) and Tony Peters (1)
 ICW Television Championship (1 time)
 Mid-Atlantic Championship Wrestling
 NWA World Tag Team Championship (Mid-Atlantic version) (1 time) - with Don Kernodle
 Mid-South Sports/Georgia Championship Wrestling
 NWA Georgia Junior Heavyweight Championship (1 time)
 NWA Georgia Tag Team Championship (2 times) - with Dick Slater (1) and Mr. Wrestling II (1)
 NWA Macon Tag Team Championship (1 time) - with Dick Slater
 Mid-South Wrestling
 Mid-South Mississippi Heavyweight Championship (1 time)
 Midwest Powerhouse Wrestling
 MPW Heavyweight Championship (1 time)
 Powerhouse Championship Wrestling
 PCW Heavyweight Championship (1 time)
 Pro Wrestling Illustrated
 PWI Rookie of the Year (1973) tied with Tony Garea
 Ranked No. 121 of the 500 best singles wrestlers of the "PWI Years" in 2003.
 Old School Wrestling Alliance
 OSWA Heavyweight Championship (1 time)
 Southeastern Championship Wrestling
 NWA Southeastern Tag Team Championship (4 times) - with Bob Roop (1), Jerry Blackwell (1) and Ron Garvin (2)
 Universal Wrestling Federation
 UWF Intercontinental Heavyweight Championship (1 time)
 UWF Southern States Championship (2 times)
 World Wrestling Entertainment
 WWE Hall of Fame (Class of 2005)
 Other Titles
 VWS Television Championship (1 time)
 Wrestling Observer Newsletter
 Most Unimproved (1986)

References

External links
WWE Hall of Fame profile
Bob Orton at Online World of Wrestling
 

1950 births
Living people
Sportspeople from Kansas City, Kansas
American male professional wrestlers
People from St. Louis County, Missouri
Professional wrestling trainers
WWE Hall of Fame inductees
Masked wrestlers
Professional wrestlers from Kansas
20th-century professional wrestlers
21st-century professional wrestlers
NWA Florida Heavyweight Champions
NWA Florida Tag Team Champions
WCW World Tag Team Champions
NWA Macon Tag Team Champions
NWA Georgia Junior Heavyweight Champions
NWA Georgia Tag Team Champions